The Electronic Journal of Statistics is an open access peer-reviewed scientific journal published by the Institute of Mathematical Statistics and the Bernoulli Society. It covers all aspects of statistics (theoretical, computational, and applied) and the editor-in-chief is Domenico Marinucci. According to the Journal Citation Reports, the journal has a 2013 impact factor of 1.024. By 2017, the impact factor was recorded as 1.529.

References

External links 
 

Statistics journals
English-language journals
Publications established in 2007
Creative Commons Attribution-licensed journals
Institute of Mathematical Statistics academic journals
Online-only journals